R. Sankara Narayana Thampi (30 September 1911 in Alleppey – 2 November 1989) was a freedom fighter, Indian National Congress member, Communist Party of India member, and activist who served as the First Speaker of the Kerala Legislative Assembly from April, 1957 to July, 1959.

References

Malayali politicians
1911 births
1989 deaths
Speakers of the Kerala Legislative Assembly
Indian independence activists from Kerala
People from Alappuzha district
Communist Party of India politicians from Kerala
Kerala MLAs 1957–1959
Travancore–Cochin MLAs 1954–1956
Government Law College, Thiruvananthapuram alumni